LUXE is an electro soul and dream pop compilation released via Cartoon Network's Adult Swim. The program was announced on May 3, 2017, with the lead single "One Thing" by Tei Shi. Curated by Adult Swim staff member, Shannon McKnight, the compilation of 15 tracks was released in-full on May 10, 2017.

Track listing

References

Adult Swim compilation albums
2017 compilation albums